The Third Federal Electoral District of Aguascalientes (III Distrito Electoral Federal de Aguascalientes) is one of the 300 Electoral Districts into which Mexico is divided for the purpose of elections to the federal Chamber of Deputies and one of three such districts in the state of Aguascalientes.

It elects one deputy to the lower house of Congress for each three-year legislative period, by means of the first past the post system.

District territory
Under the 2005 redistricting process, it is made up of the western portion of the municipality of Aguascalientes.

The district's head town (cabecera distrital), where results from individual polling stations are gathered together and collated, is the state capital, the city of  Aguascalientes, Ags.

Previous districting schemes

1996–2005 district
Between 1996 and 2005, the district was composed of southern portion of the municipality of Aguascalientes.

Deputies returned to Congress from this district 

LVII Legislature
1997–2000: Fernando Gómez Esparza (PRI)
LVIII Legislature
2000–2003: José Luis Novales Arellano (PAN)
LIX Legislature
2003–2006: Jaime del Conde Ugarte (PAN)
LX Legislature
2006–2009: Alma Hilda Medina Macías (PAN)

References 

Federal electoral districts of Mexico
Aguascalientes